Omrao Khan beenkar was a vina wizard of the 18th century. He was a descendant of Naubat Khan.

Early life
Omrao Khan beenkar was born in Agra to Naubat Khan II. He was the nephew of Nirmol Shah and first cousin of Pyar Khan, Jafar Khan and Basit Khan, of Awadh. He came to Banda on the invitation of Nawab of Banda. Omrao Khan had two sons Ameer Khan beenkar and Rahim Khan. Ameer Khan was the father of legendary vina player Wazir Khan.

Career
The court of Maharaja Udit Narayan Singh of Banaras was the home of the one of the foremost bin playing lines of the time.Topmost among the musicians of banaras and first among all contemporary musicians named by Karam Imam is Omrao Khan. Omrao Khan was the master of Nawab of Banda 'Hashmat Jung' or Ali Bahadur II who participated in the 1857 war of independence.Ali Naqi the prime minister of Awadh and Raja sahab Rewa also learnt music under his instruction.

Surbahar
Omrao Khan invented surbahar and taught it to his disciple Ghulam Mohammad at Banda.

See also
Sadarang
Wazir Khan (Rampur)
Tansen
Naubat Khan
Kishangarh

References

18th-century Indian musicians
Indian royalty
Mughal nobility
Indian Shia Muslims
Hindustani instrumentalists
Indian male classical musicians